Space Sweepers is a 2021 South Korean space Western film directed by Jo Sung-hee, starring Song Joong-ki, Kim Tae-ri, Jin Seon-kyu and Yoo Hae-jin. Regarded as the first Korean film space blockbuster, it was released directly on Netflix on February 5, 2021.

Plot
The movie is set in the year 2092 where Earth is uninhabitable. A new orbiting home for humanity is built by UTS corporation, but only the elite are permitted to become citizens while others are left on Earth. The film follows a crew of space sweepers who work for UTS collecting space debris and selling it to the company factory. The crew discovers a child robot named Dorothy who contains a weapon of mass destruction created by the terrorist group Black Fox. They negotiate a ransom for returning Dorothy, but their plan is foiled when UTS soldiers stage a massacre at the club where the exchange was supposed to take place. The crew must navigate this dangerous situation while also dealing with their own personal struggles.

Cast
 Song Joong-ki as Kim Tae-ho – Former Commander of the Space Guards and the first ever UTS Genius.
Kim Tae-ri as Captain Jang / Jang Hyun-sook – Former Special Forces Squad officer who later deserted her post to create her own pirate organization. She attempted to assassinate CEO James Sullivan in which her entire pirate crew were killed.
 Jin Seon-kyu as Tiger Park / Park Kyung-soo – Former Drug King who escaped Earth after being arrested and sentenced to death.
 Yoo Hae-jin as Robot Bubs – Former military robot trying to save up for a skin graft
 Richard Armitage as James Sullivan – The CEO of UTS and the main antagonist.
 Kim Mu-yeol as Kang Hyeon-u – Kang Kot-nim's father and a scientist.
 Park Ye-rin as Dorothy / Kang Kot-nim – First believed to be a robot, she is actually a human who was injected with nanobots by her father as a last resort to heal her.
 Oh Ji-yul as Kim Su-ni – Tae-ho's adopted daughter
 Anupam Tripathi as Sullivan's assistant
 Kim Hyang-gi as Bubs' new body
 Christian Lagahit as Restaurant manager

Themes 
The film criticises capitalism. The process of the colonization of Mars in the film has been compared to billionaires prepping for an apocalypse. Avery Kaplan of ComicsBeat noted that "while capitalism may make the members of the Victory crew more likely to go for each others’ throats, it can't completely eradicate their intrinsic morality" and pointed to Bubs' arc as showcasing the barriers to trans healthcare that exist under capitalism. Kambole Campbell of Polygon notes that "one of the film’s most striking elements is its casual multiculturalism. Characters from presumably dissolved nations speak to each other in a mix of their native languages, while English mostly appears as the language of power and of the film’s white antagonists."

Production

Development
The early working title of the film was Lightning Arc.

Jo Sung-hee started writing the story 10 years prior to the film's release, after a friend talked to him about the dangers of space junk. He said that "It started with the idea of space travelers collecting space junk. I heard about how these fast-moving fragments of space debris are growing and leading to in-space collisions. I realized that this subject has already been dealt with in animations and games, but never in a film. I started writing the script wondering how Koreans, who possess a tenacious mentality, would approach this problem."

In May 2019, the Chinese multinational entertainment company Huayi Tencent invested $4.2 million in the film. The visual effects company Dexter Studios, which was behind the production of the films Along with the Gods: The Two Worlds, Ashfall and Wandering Earth, was hired for Space Sweepers.

Casting
In June 2018, it was reported that Song Joong-ki agreed to star in Jo Sung-hee's next film, making it their second collaboration after A Werewolf Boy (2012). Kim Tae-ri was offered the role of the spaceship captain in January 2019, followed by Jin Seon-kyu for the role of the keeper in April. The final lineup was confirmed in June 2019, with Yoo Hae-jin joining the main cast in the form of robotic motion capture and voice acting. English actor Richard Armitage also revealed through his Instagram account that he would start filming in July 2019, making Space Sweepers his first Korean film.

Filming
Principal photography began on July 3, 2019, and filming was completed on November 2.

Release
In June 2020, it was announced that the release was postponed due to the COVID-19 pandemic with a plan for the film to premiere during the Chuseok holiday. In August 2020, the release was once again postponed due to the increase of COVID-19 cases in South Korea.

In November 2020, it was announced that the film would be released exclusively on Netflix. Space Sweepers was released on February 5, 2021.

In May 2021, Space Sweeper's second film is scheduled to be produced.

Reception

Audience viewership
The film debuted at No.1 on Netflix in 16 countries including France, Malaysia, Croatia, South Korea and Philippines. The movie also dominated Netflix's daily top 10 rankings in 80 countries upon its premiere. Space Sweepers also gathered more than 26 million household viewers on Netflix during the first 28 days of its release or 53,340,000 hours watched.

Critical response
The site's critics consensus reads, "As a story, Space Sweepers isn't as adventurous as its star-navigating protagonists -- but relatable characters and impressive effects keep it from drifting out of orbit." On Metacritic, it has a weighted average score of 64 out of 100, based on reviews from 4 critics, indicating "generally favorable reviews".

Zaki Hasan of IGN argued that "even as [the film is] a concoction of various familiar sci-fi tropes, they’ve been reassembled with verve and passion enough to sand down any cynicism when taking it all in." Dais Johnston of Inverse argued that the film "proves that Netflix's big bet on international audiences is paying off." Gavia Baker-Whitelaw of The Daily Dot compared the film to Cowboy Bebop and Guardians of the Galaxy, arguing that the film was "hardly groundbreaking stuff" but that "there’s always something fun to look at on-screen," and praising the diversity of the characters, stating that the film "feels far more international than most Hollywood blockbusters." Karen Han of Slate stated that the film was "one of the rare space operas that doesn’t posit that English has somehow become a universal language" and that Bubs' arc "feels like one small step for transgender representation and, arguably, a giant one for blockbuster filmmaking from any nation."

Adaptations
A webtoon based on the film premiered on May 26, 2020, on Daum and KakaoPage. It premiered globally on February 8, 2021.

Awards and nominations

References

External links
 
 
 

2010s Korean-language films
Korean-language Netflix original films
2021 science fiction action films
2010s dystopian films
South Korean post-apocalyptic films
South Korean science fiction action films
Space adventure films
English-language South Korean films
Films set in the 2090s
Films set on spacecraft
Films using motion capture
Films postponed due to the COVID-19 pandemic
Films not released in theaters due to the COVID-19 pandemic
2010s South Korean films